In Greek mythology, Learchus (Ancient Greek: Λέαρχος) or Learches was a Boeotian prince as the son of King Athamas and Ino, daughter of King Cadmus of Thebes. He was the brother of Melicertes.

Mythology
The story of Learchus is part of the Theban Cycle which was elaborated by Ovid in his Metamorphoses. He was killed as a boy by his father, Athamas, whom Hera drove insane as punishment for having received and raised Dionysus, the illegitimate son of Zeus and Semele, Ino's sister.

Athamas, blinded by the madness, exchanged Learchus for a lion (or a ram/ fawn, in other versions) and killed him. After this, Athamas went in frenzied pursuit of Ino, who jumped into the sea with their other son, Melicertes. Ovid adds some details to this story, saying, for instance, that Learchus had spontaneously stretched out his arms to his father to hug him, not knowing that he was mad and would slay him.

Dante cites this myth as an example of insanity in his Inferno.

References
Ovid, Metamorphoses, Book IV, Fable VII
Dante, Divine Comedy, Inferno, Canto XXX, 7–12.
Publius Ovidius Naso, Metamorphoses translated by Brookes More (1859-1942). Boston, Cornhill Publishing Co. 1922. Online version at the Perseus Digital Library.
Publius Ovidius Naso, Metamorphoses. Hugo Magnus. Gotha (Germany). Friedr. Andr. Perthes. 1892. Latin text available at the Perseus Digital Library.

Princes in Greek mythology
Family of Athamas
Boeotian characters in Greek mythology
Boeotian mythology